Marigold may refer to:

 Marigold (color), a yellow-orange color

It may also refer to:

Plants 
 In the genus Calendula:
 Common marigold, Calendula officinalis (also called pot marigold, ruddles, or Scotch marigold)
 In the genus Tagetes:
 African marigold or Aztec marigold, Tagetes erecta
 French marigold, Tagetes patula
 Mexican marigold, Tagetes lucida
 Signet marigold, Tagetes tenuifolia
 Cape marigold (disambiguation), referring to several species
 Desert marigold, Baileya multiradiata
 Marsh marigold, Caltha palustris
 Corn marigold, Glebionis segetum
 Tree marigold, Tithonia diversifolia

Arts and media

Film and television 
 Marigold (1938 film), a British film
 Marigold (2007 film), a Bollywood romantic comedy
 Marigold Gregson, a character on the British drama series Downton Abbey
 "Marigold", nickname for the character Winston Spencer Churchill in the British television series In Sickness and in Health

Music 
Marigold (band), a Swedish indie-pop band
Marigold (Mari Hamada album), 2002
Marigold (Pinegrove album), or the title track, 2020
"Marigold" (Aimyon song), 2018
"Marigold" (Dave Grohl song), 1992
"Marigold", a song from the album Bloom by Caligula's Horse
"Marigold", a song from the album The Caitiff Choir by It Dies Today
"Marigold", a piano piece by Billy Mayerl
"Marigold", a 2016 song by Periphery
"Marigold", a song from the album Air for Free by Relient K
"Marigold", a song by Sugarplum Fairy
"Messiah Complex III: Marigold", a song from the album Virus by Haken

Other media
"Marigolds" (short story), by Eugenia Collier
Marigold Farmer, a character in the webcomic Questionable Content

People
 Marigold Linton (born 1936), Native American cognitive psychologist
 Marigold Southey (born 1928), an Australian philanthropist who served as Lieutenant-Governor of Victoria from 2001 to 2006

Places
 Marigold, California
 Marigold, Illinois, an unincorporated community
 Marigold mine, a gold mine in Valmy, Nevada

Ships 
 , various ships of the British Royal Navy
 HMT Marigold, a trawler requisitioned by the Royal Navy in the Second World War - see List of requisitioned trawlers of the Royal Navy (WWII)
 , a ship used by the Union Navy during the American Civil War
 USAHS Marigold, a United States Army hospital ship during World War II
 USLHT Marigold, a 1890 lighthouse tender which served on the Great Lakes

Other 
 Marigold (color), a yellow-orange color
 Marigold (given name)
 Operation Marigold, a secret attempt to reach a compromise solution to the Vietnam War

English feminine given names
English-language feminine given names